The Cauca molly (Poecilia caucana) is a freshwater fish in the family Poeciliidae. This fish is found in Panama, Venezuela, and Colombia, where it lives in shallow waters in the basins of the Lebrija, Magdalena, Cauca and other rivers. P. caucana eats mosquito larvae and algae.

Description
The male Poecilia caucana grows to a length of  while the female can attain . Generally silvery in colour, this fish can be identified by the black blotch at the base of the dorsal fin. Some specimens show some degree of narrow transverse banding, but this may be the lingering remains of colour changes associated with breeding.

Distribution and habitat
P. caucana is native to freshwater systems in tropical Central and South America. Its range extends from the east-flowing rivers of Panama to the Cauca River in Colombia. Its range also includes the Catatumbo River in northern Colombia, and Lake Maracaibo in Venezuela into which it flows. This fish is a very tolerant species, able to withstand considerable variations in temperature and salinity, as well as low levels of oxygen.

Ecology
An omnivore, P. caucana feeds on algae, on mosquito larvae and on insects that fall onto the water surface. Proposals have been made to use this species, as well as the closely related guppy (Poecilia reticulata), in biological pest control of mosquitoes. The Cauca molly is a livebearer; the female produces a batch of ten to twenty-five live young after a gestation period of about four weeks. The juvenile fish are cared for by the male.

Use in aquaria
This fish is sometimes kept in aquaria.

References 

Poecilia
Live-bearing fish
Ovoviviparous fish
Freshwater fish of Colombia
Magdalena River
Fish of Panama
Fish of Venezuela
Taxa named by Franz Steindachner
Fish described in 1880